Sonny Is King is an album by blues musician Sonny Terry recorded and sessions in 1960 and 1962 and released on the Bluesville label.

Reception

AllMusic reviewer Thom Owens stated: "Half of Sonny Is King is devoted to a rare session between Sonny Terry and Lightnin' Hopkins ... but the rhythm section fails to kick the pair into overdrive, and much of the music disappointingly meanders ... That's proven by the second side of the album, where Terry falls into the comfortable setting of duetting with Brownie McGhee. While these aren't among the duo's very best recordings, they are nonetheless enjoyable, suggesting that there's something to be said for the familiar".

Track listing
All compositions by Sonny Terry
 "One Monkey Don't Stop the Show" – 3:04
 "Changed the Lock On My Door" – 3:30
 "Tater Pie" – 2:32
 "She's So Sweet" – 2:39
 "Diggin' My Potatoes" 	3:32
 "Sonny's Coming" – 2:50
 "Ida Mae" – 3:10
 "Callin' My Mama" – 2:33
 "Bad Luck" – 4:10
 "Blues from the Bottom" – 4:17

Personnel

Performance
Sonny Terry – harmonica, vocals
Lightnin' Hopkins (tracks 1–5), Brownie McGhee (tracks 6–10) – guitar
Leonard Gaskin – bass (tracks 1–5)
Belton Evans – drums (tracks 1–5)

Production
 Ozzie Cadena (tracks 1–5), Kenneth S. Goldstein (tracks 6–10) – producer
 Rudy Van Gelder – engineer

References

Sonny Terry albums
1963 albums
Bluesville Records albums
Albums produced by Ozzie Cadena
Albums recorded at Van Gelder Studio